The Tampolli RTA-2001 is a sports prototype race car, designed, developed, and built by Italian manufacturer Tampolli, for sports car racing, conforming to the FIA's LMP675/SR2 class, produced between 2001 and 2003.

References

Sports prototypes
Le Mans Prototypes